Kregme Parish is a parish in the Diocese of Helsingør in Halsnæs Municipality, Denmark.

References 

Halsnæs Municipality
Parishes of Denmark